Daniel Thompson (born 22 April 2004) is a speedway rider from England.

Speedway career 
Along with his twin brother Joe, Thompson initially gained experience competing at junior level, and as a mascot for Leicester Lions. Thompson has raced in all three tiers of British Speedway. In 2019, he rode for the Leicester Lion Cubs before moving up to the Leicester Lions senior team for the 2021 SGB Championship season.

In 2022, he continued to represent the Lions but also rode in the SGB Premiership for Sheffield Tigers, joining them as their number 8 rider. He helped the Lion Cubs dominate the season by winning the league, successfully defending their National League Knockout Cup title (from 2019) and winning the Pairs Championship, partnered by his brother Joe. In addition, he finished top of the NDL averages.

In 2023, he re-signed for the Lions as they moved up a division for the SGB Premiership 2023 as their rising star and re-signed for Leicester Lion Cubs for the 2023 National Development League speedway season.

References 

Living people
2004 births
British speedway riders
Leicester Lions riders
Sheffield Tigers riders
Sportspeople from Nuneaton